Vijayawada (urban) mandal is one of the 20 mandals in NTR district of the Indian state of Andhra Pradesh. It is under the administration of Vijayawada revenue division and has its headquarters at Vijayawada city. The mandal lies on the banks of Krishna River, bounded by Vijayawada (rural) mandal and Penamaluru mandals. The mandal is also a part of the Andhra Pradesh Capital Region under the jurisdiction of APCRDA.

Demographics 

 census, the mandal had a population of 1,021,806. The total population constitute, 512,417 males and 509,389 females —a sex ratio of 994 females per 1000 males. 100,309 children are in the age group of 0–6 years, of which 51,950 are boys and 48,359 are girls. The average literacy rate stands at 81.35% with 749,635 literates.

Cities,Towns and villages 

Vijayawada (urban) mandal consists of only one City that is Vijayawada and has no villages and hence, it is a fully urban mandal.

Vijayawada Urban mandal is divided in to 4 mandals

 Gandhi Nagar (Vijayawada Central)
 Ajit Singh Nagar (Vijayawada North)
 Patamata (Vijayawada East)
 Bhavanipuram (Vijayawada West)

See also 
Vijayawada revenue division

References

Mandals in NTR district